"Halloween" is the fifth single by the American punk rock band Misfits. It was released on October 31, 1981 on singer Glenn Danzig's label Plan 9 Records. 5,000 copies of the single were pressed on black 7-inch vinyl, some of which included a lyrics sheet. This was the first Misfits release to use their Famous Monsters of Filmland-inspired logo, as well as the first to refer to the band as simply "Misfits".

The "Halloween" single was the last Misfits release to include guitarist Bobby Steele. Both songs on the single had been recorded in August 1980 for a planned album. During the sessions bassist Jerry Only was grooming his younger brother Doyle Wolfgang von Frankenstein to join the band, and Doyle recorded his own guitar tracks and overdubs separately in addition to Steele's. The tracks were mixed in September, but in October Steele was ejected from the band in favor of Doyle and the planned album was scrapped. Three of the songs were released as the 3 Hits from Hell EP, while "Halloween" and "Halloween II" were released as a single. In 2001 Caroline Records attempted to release the complete sessions as 12 Hits from Hell, but production was called off after Danzig and Only expressed concerns with the album's layout, packaging, liner notes, mixing, and mastering.

The lyrics to "Halloween II" are in nonstandard Latin, translating to:

Re-releases and other versions
Following the band's breakup in 1983, the 12 Hits from Hell version of "Halloween" was reissued on the 1985 compilation album Legacy of Brutality, one of the few tracks on the album not to have overdubbed guitar and bass tracks recorded by Danzig. The single versions of both songs were re-released on Collection II in 1995, and all of the versions were included in The Misfits box set in 1996, along with the 12 Hits from Hell studio recording of "Halloween II".

Track listing

Personnel
 Glenn Danzig – lead vocals
 Bobby Steele – guitar on "Halloween II"
 Jerry Only – bass
 Arthur Googy – drums
 Doyle – guitar on "Halloween"

Cover versions
Mudhoney included a sample of "Halloween" in their 1988 cover of Sonic Youth's song of the same title on the "Touch Me I'm Sick"/"Halloween" split single. "Halloween" has been covered by several other bands in subsequent years: East Bay punk rock AFI covered the song for their All Hallow's EP (1999), and Dropkick Murphys recorded a version for the compilation Back on the Streets: Japanese/American Punk Unity (2000) which was later re-released on Singles Collection, Volume 2 (2005). The American death metal band Winds of Plague recorded a cover of the song that they included as an iTunes bonus track on their 2009 album The Great Stone War.

Danzig re-recorded "Halloween II" with his post-Misfits project Samhain. This version appeared on November-Coming-Fire (1986) and Live 85-86 (2001). "Halloween II" has also been covered by Tenebre on the tribute album Hell on Earth: A Tribute to the Misfits (2000) and by Cradle of Filth on the Underworld: Evolution soundtrack and Thornography  (2006), though Cradle of Filth's cover is based on the Samhain version.

Alkaline Trio version

The punk rock band Alkaline Trio recorded a cover version of "Halloween" in August 2002 while on tour. Their version was released as a single through Asian Man Records, with a cover of "Children in Heat" (from "Horror Business") as the B-side, and given away exclusively to attendees at their performance on October 31, 2002 at the Metro Chicago. This performance was filmed and released on DVD in 2003 as Halloween at the Metro, the fourth installment in Kung Fu Films' The Show Must Go Off! series. In 2004 the band re-released the single as a download exclusively to members of their fan club the Blood Pact, adding a cover of The Damned's "Wait for the Blackout" recorded in 2003 at the BBC's Maida Vale Studios.

Track listing

Personnel
Matt Skiba – guitar, lead vocals
Dan Andriano – bass
Derek Grant – drums

See also
Misfits discography

References

1981 songs
Misfits (band) songs
Horror punk songs
Halloween songs
Songs written by Glenn Danzig